The second edition of Miss Diva was held on 14 October 2014. Fifteen contestants were shortlisted from thousands of aspirants in the country, who were mentored by Miss Universe 2000, Lara Dutta. At the end of the event, Miss Universe India 2013, Manasi Moghe crowned Noyonita Lodh as her successor. She represented India India at the Miss Universe 2014 pageant held in Doral, Florida, USA on 25 January 2015. At the same event, Alankrita Sahai was crowned as Miss Diva - Earth 2014 and Asha Bhat was crowned as Miss Diva - Supranational 2014.

Final results
Color keys

Special Awards

Contestants

Crossovers
Miss Diva
 2019 : Vartika Singh (Miss Universe India)
 2015 : Hida Siddique

Femina Miss India
 2015 : Vartika Singh (Miss India Grand International)
 2014 : Lopamudra Raut (3rd Runner Up)
 2013 : Lopamudra Raut

References

External links
 Official site
  
2014 beauty pageants